Filinota is a moth genus of the family Depressariidae.

Species
 Filinota cassiteranthes Meyrick, 1932
 Filinota dictyota (Walsingham, 1912)
 Filinota gratiosa (Felder & Rogenhofer, 1875)
 Filinota hermosella Busck, 1911
 Filinota ignita (Busck, 1912)
 Filinota ithymetra Meyrick, 1926
 Filinota lamprocosma Meyrick, 1916
 Filinota regifica Meyrick, 1921
 Filinota rhodograpta Meyrick, 1915
 Filinota sphenoplecta Meyrick, 1921
 Filinota vociferans Meyrick, 1930

References

 
Depressariinae
Moth genera